"Thinkin' About You" is a song performed by American R&B singer Mario. It was written by Rico Love and produced by The Runners and The Monarch. It was released on September 4, 2009 as the second single from his fourth studio album D.N.A..

The song debuted on the U.S. Billboard Hot R&B/Hip-Hop Songs, at number 96. Since then, it reached a peak of number 45 on the chart.

Background and release
Initially Mario told his fans through his video blog that "Stranded" would be released as his second single. However it was then reported that "Thinkin' About You" would be released instead and was set to feature additional vocals from Diddy. A version of the song featuring Ace Hood leaked online which was quickly dubbed the official demo for the Diddy version. When the song finally premiered on US radio in September, it featured just Mario's vocals and confirmed that neither Diddy, nor Ace Hood, would appear on the song. Later, the version with Diddy leaked on the internet.

Remixes
The version with Diddy was a remix. Other remixes leaked to the internet featuring Kelly Rowland and Ace Hood.

Critical reception
A reviewer for music website Djbooth.net said, "With the follow-up single, the singer reaches out to fans of his more traditional R&B balladry in addition to the club crowd" also, he adds "As if Mario’s Trey Songz-esque vocals and Rico Love‘s songwriting weren’t enough to sweep this female off her feet, The Runners heighten the ambiance yet further with a steamy, synth-packed instrumental".

Music video
Mario confirmed via his official Twitter page that he will be shooting the video in London on September 27, 2009. The video was directed by Chris Robinson. RichGirl's Audra Simmons is the lead girl in the video.

The official video was debuted on BET's 106 & Park on October 13, 2009 and has since then reached the number one spot on the top ten countdown. It also ranked at number 65 on BET's Notarized: Top 100 Videos of 2009 countdown.

Credits and personnel
 Songwriting - Andrew Harr, Jermaine Jackson, Andre Davidson, Karlyn Ramsey, Sean Davidson, Rico Love
 Production - The Runners, The Monarch, co-produced by Rico Love
 Vocal production - Rico Love
 Vocals additional - Rico Love
 Mixing - Manny Marroquin, assisted by Christian Plata
 Recorded - James Wisner
 Engineer, additional pro-tools - Jeff "Supa Jeff' Villanueva
 Synthesizer, additional synths - Big Fish Audio
 Mario – D.N.A. (2009, CD)

Charts

Release history

References

2009 singles
Mario (singer) songs
Music videos directed by Chris Robinson (director)
Songs written by Rico Love
Song recordings produced by Rico Love
Songs written by Jermaine Jackson (hip hop producer)
Songs written by Andrew Harr
Song recordings produced by the Runners
2009 songs
J Records singles
Songs written by Mario (American singer)
Songs written by Andre Davidson
Songs written by Sean Davidson
Song recordings produced by the Monarch (production team)